Woodrow Wilson Jackson III (born June 10, 1970) is an American composer and session musician. He is best known for his work with Rockstar Games, composing scores for its video games Red Dead Redemption, L.A. Noire, Grand Theft Auto V, and Red Dead Redemption 2. Born in Oil City, Pennsylvania, Jackson studied at Virginia State University for one year, taking harmonica lessons before dropping out and playing guitar in a band. He moved to Los Angeles in 1992, and eventually joined the band Friends of Dean Martinez. He later became a session musician, working on the soundtracks of films like Ocean's Twelve (2004) and The Devil Wears Prada (2006). Since 2009, he has owned and operated Electro-Vox Recording Studios in Hollywood, where he has recorded two original albums and much of his composing work. He is an avid collector of vintage instruments.

Jackson began working with Rockstar Games in 2008, joining Bill Elm to co-compose the music of Red Dead Redemption, partly inspired by Ennio Morricone's work on the Dollars Trilogy. They returned to compose the score for the downloadable content campaign Undead Nightmare in 2010, and Jackson provided additional in-game music for L.A. Noire in 2011. For the music of Grand Theft Auto V, he collaborated with The Alchemist, Oh No, and Tangerine Dream. Jackson continued working with Rockstar for the music of Red Dead Redemption 2, composing roughly 60 hours of music over five years. His work on Rockstar's games has been praised, and he has received awards from the Game Audio Network Guild Awards, Game Developers Choice Awards, Spike Video Game Awards, and The Game Awards.

Early life and education 

Woodrow Wilson Jackson III was born in Oil City, Pennsylvania, on June 10, 1970, to Linda Sue Jackson and Woodrow Wilson Jackson Jr. Jackson was raised in York, Pennsylvania, and Richmond, Virginia. He was often inspired by artists such as Tom Waits while growing up. Jackson attended William Penn High School, at which he was an honors student in his final year in 1988, and studied at Virginia State University for one year, where he took harmonica lessons, before transferring to study under Ellis Marsalis Jr. He eventually dropped out when his funds were depleted, and turned to playing guitar with the blues band The Useless Playboys, often performing as the opening act for The Reverend Horton Heat.

Career 
In 1992, shortly after the 1992 Los Angeles riots, Jackson moved from Richmond to Los Angeles. In 1995, he collaborated with musician Bill Elm, who introduced Jackson to the band Friends of Dean Martinez. Jackson eventually acted as a fill-in for an absent guitar player before remaining with the band as a full member for some time. He also worked for McCabe's Guitar Shop for several years, where he learned how to play chromatic harmonica in one lesson from Dave Gage. Jackson co-composed the scores for the films Men Cry Bullets (1998) with Ivan Knight and Forest Dunn, and The Last Man (2000) with Knight. He later became a session musician, working on the soundtracks of films like Ocean's Twelve (2004) and The Devil Wears Prada (2006). Jackson appears in the documentary film Moog (2004), performing alongside Money Mark. As part of Friends of Dean Martinez, Jackson worked with Elm on the score for the film Fast Food Nation (2006).

Jackson spent around six years "searching for a new sound that no one ever had heard"; he crafted his own guitorgan by connecting a Chamberlin keyboard to a guitar, an instrument he later used on films such as Ocean's Twelve and Ocean's Thirteen (2007). Jackson's musical style has been described as a "smooth blend of Krautrock, funk, ambient and brick-smashing instrumental rap". In 2008, Jackson and Petra Haden released the album Ten Years, titled after the length of time it was in production. Around 2009, Jackson took over Melrose Avenue-based Electro-Vox Recording Studios, which was established in 1931 and is said to be the oldest privately-held recording studio in the United States. Jackson is an avid collector of vintage instruments and recording equipment for the studio. Around 2010, Jackson was working on instrument restoration with the family of Harry Chamberlin, inventor of the Chamberlin keyboard. Jackson is featured in Melodrama: The Mellotron Movie (2010), a documentary directed by Dianna Dilworth about the Chamberlin.

In 2008, video game company Rockstar Games signed Jackson to co-compose the music for Red Dead Redemption (2010), together with Elm. They composed approximately 200 tracks for the game over 15 months, partly at Electro-Vox, the first project Jackson worked on as owner of the studio. When researching music for inspiration, Jackson found that there was no contemporaneous "Western sound"; he felt that the soundtracks of 1960s Western films, such as Ennio Morricone's work on the Dollars Trilogy, was more representative of Western music. Shortly after finding a German guitar in Los Angeles with the appropriate sound and "a perfect tremolo", Jackson returned home and wrote the game's main theme. While experimenting for the game's northern region, Jackson recorded the heartbeat of his unborn daughter using his iPhone. Jackson collaborated with Tommy Morgan, whom he had met while working on Ocean's Thirteen, on the soundtrack's harmonica tracks. Jackson worked with David Holmes—with whom he had worked on films like Ocean's Twelve and Ocean's Thirteen—to produce the soundtrack. The game's score was praised by critics, receiving favorable comparisons to Morricone's work; it won awards from GameSpot, the Game Audio Network Guild Awards, and the Spike Video Game Awards.

Jackson and Elm returned to compose the score for Undead Nightmare (2010), a downloadable content campaign for Red Dead Redemption. For Undead Nightmare, he sampled several of the tracks from the original game using E-mu SP-1200, which he discovered from Money Mark. Jackson provided the reassembled music to Elm before going on tour with Vincent Gallo; when he returned from tour, the score was finalized. The soundtrack was generally well-received in the context of the game. Jackson continued working with Rockstar by providing additional incidental music and sounds for L.A. Noire (2011), and additional production and studio provision for Max Payne 3 (2012). For L.A. Noire, Jackson re-orchestrated one of the themes and wrote much of the in-game music. While the game's score largely uses a live orchestra, Jackson found that this led to difficulties with interactive music as the player can hear the loop; inspired by film noir and the works of musicians like Bernard Herrmann, Jackson departed from the existing music and wrote original tracks in about a month. L.A. Noires music was ultimately awarded at the British Academy Games Awards and the Game Audio Network Guild Awards.

In 2011, Jackson contributed the song "Moshi Moshi", recorded at Electro-Vox, to the charity album Play for Japan: The Album; the title was inspired by the manner in which Masa Tsuzuki—Jackson's audio engineer for L.A. Noire—would answer the telephone. Proceeds from the album went to the Japanese Red Cross Society following the 2011 Tōhoku earthquake and tsunami; Jackson had recently spent some time in the country, where he met the album's producer Akira Yamaoka. Jayson Napolitano of Original Sound Version described Jackson's song as "a contemplative, lumbering piece of music that says a lot with few notes". He also composed the music for The Real Rocky (2011), a television film broadcast as part of the series 30 for 30. In 2012, Jackson provided a song for the soundtrack of ModNation Racers: Road Trip (2012), and provided additional music for the first season of Nashville, with T Bone Burnett. Jason Schwartzman engaged Jackson to co-compose the scores for the short film Here and feature film Goats (both 2012) with him; they had been close friends for about fifteen years, having bonded over their mutual love of music since Schwartzman was around 17 years old. Jackson released an original album, Dos Manos, in Italy in July 2012, produced by Holmes and published by Interbang Records and Brutture Moderne.

Jackson later worked in a team of producers for the music of Rockstar's Grand Theft Auto V (2013), collaborating with The Alchemist, Oh No, and Tangerine Dream. Jackson's initial role was to provide the score for Trevor Philips's missions, and he took influence from artists such as The Mars Volta and Queens of the Stone Age. When he learnt that the team would be building off each other's work, he voiced concern that the finished product could be disjointed. After sharing his work with the team, he was particularly impressed by the contributions by Edgar Froese, Tangerine Dream's founding member. Froese had interpolated funk sounds with Jackson's hip-hop influences. Froese and Jackson then sent their work between The Alchemist and Oh No, who heavily sampled it. To compose his part of the score, Jackson created a supergroup called Jaws, featuring himself, Keefus Ciancia, Deantoni Parks, Gus Seyffert, and Michael Shuman. The score was well-received in the context of the game. For the soundtrack release, Jackson filtered through the six terabytes of material before transferring it to DJ Shadow for mixing. Alongside The Alchemist, Oh No, and Tangerine Dream, Jackson co-presented a 70-minute live concert featuring the game's original score at the New York Film Festival in September 2013.

Jackson continued working with Rockstar as the composer for Red Dead Redemption 2 (2018), the prequel to Red Dead Redemption; Ivan Pavlovich, director of music and audio at Rockstar, invited Jackson to join the project around Grand Theft Auto Vs release. Jackson composed roughly 60 hours of music for the game over five years, though not every track made the final product; the game has 192 interactive mission tracks. Jackson was inspired by the music of 1950s samurai films, particularly the work of Masaru Sato on Akira Kurosawa's films, as well as the television series Kung Fu (1972–1975) and the Hollywood session musicians of the 1950s–1970s. To ensure that his music was effective for the game, Jackson listened to the music while shooting at a target range using a gun from the game's time. He also purchased several instruments from the Wrecking Crew that were featured on classic cowboy films, such as Dennis Budimir's 1898 Martin 1–28 gut string and Tommy Tedesco's Harmina Salinas Hijas gut string. He also acquired a 1920s Gibson Mandobass used on Bullitt (1968) that recreated an "ominous" bell sound, ukuleles from Butch Cassidy and the Sundance Kid (1969), and a nylon guitar used on Unforgiven (1992). When creating the score, Jackson gathered musician friends like Haden, bassist Mike Watt, and drummer Jon Theodore for jam sessions, often using Jackson's old instruments. Jackson's work on the game was praised by critics; it won awards from Giant Bomb, IGN, The Game Awards, the Hollywood Music in Media Awards, and the Titanium Awards, and received nominations at the New York Game Awards and the SXSW Gaming Awards. The original score was released digitally in August 2019, and physically in April 2020. Jackson led an hour-long live performance of the game's soundtrack at the Red Bull Music Festival in Los Angeles in February 2019.

In June 2020, Jackson released his first original solo album, Tres Flores, alongside a digital re-release of Dos Manos.

Personal life 
Jackson is a baptised Mormon. In 2010, he married Sharon Sheinwold, a talent manager for Ocean Avenue Entertainment, who formerly worked as a talent agent and partner for United Talent Agency from 1992 to 2008, and for William Morris Endeavor (formerly Endeavor Talent Agency) from 2008 to 2021. They met at Largo in Los Angeles. In 2021, Jackson lived in Tucson, Arizona. Jackson has two daughters, Georgia Washington Jackson (born mid-2010) and Theodora Roosevelt Jackson; Georgia was credited on "The Outlaw's Return" in Red Dead Redemption for her heartbeat, in Grand Theft Auto V for keyboards, and in Red Dead Redemption 2 for percussion and vocals, while Theodora was credited in Grand Theft Auto V for drums and percussions.

Works

Albums

Video games

Film

Television

Other

Awards and nominations

References

External links 
 
 

1970 births
21st-century American composers
21st-century American male musicians
American male composers
American rock guitarists
American session musicians
Latter Day Saints from Pennsylvania
Living people
People from Oil City, Pennsylvania
Video game composers